Ivan Robert Vicelich  (born 3 September 1976) is a former New Zealand professional footballer who is currently assistant coach at Auckland City FC in the ASB Premiership.

He is his country and Oceania's most-capped international of all time with 88 caps between 1995 and 2013, and featured at the 2010 FIFA World Cup.

Club career 
Vicelich played for Waitakere City FC and Central United in the Lotto Sport Italia NRFL Premier before establishing himself as one of the best players for the Football Kingz, when the Auckland-based club joined the Australian National Soccer League in 1999.

Thanks to the contacts he made through his Football Kingz colleague, John Lammers, he was able to impress Roda JC Kerkrade, with whom he signed in 2001. He was a regular player for the Dutch team until May 2006 when he signed a 2-year contract with fellow Eredivisie club side, RKC Waalwijk.

He returned to New Zealand and signed with Auckland City FC in the New Zealand Football Championship before the start of the 2008–09 season and was a key member of the Auckland squad that contested the 2009 FIFA Club World Cup in the United Arab Emirates in 2009.

In July 2010, following the 2010 FIFA World Cup in which Vicelich started every one of New Zealand's three games, he signed a short-term deal to play for Chinese Super League club Shenzhen F.C. for four months. He returned to former club Auckland City FC in December 2010, following a 30-day stand-down period. Aged 38, he received the adidas Bronze Ball as the third best player at the 2014 FIFA Club World Cup in Morocco – at which Auckland finished in a surprise third place – bettered only by Real Madrid duo Cristiano Ronaldo and Sergio Ramos.

He played his last game for Auckland City FC in the 2015 final which they won against Team Wellington on penalty kicks, qualifying for a record 6 consecutive times to the FIFA Club World Cup.

Vicelich is now the assistant coach at Auckland City FC.

International career 
Vicelich made his full New Zealand debut with a substitute appearance in a 0–7 loss against Uruguay on 25 June 1995.

He was included in the New Zealand side for the 1999 FIFA Confederations Cup finals tournament in Mexico where he featured in all three group games, and again for the 2003 FIFA Confederations Cup finals tournament in France, playing in just 2 matches.

On 16 August 2008 Vicelich announced his retirement from international football, however on 22 May 2009 he answered an SOS by All Whites head coach Ricki Herbert and was recalled to the national team for the 2009 Confederations Cup tournament in South Africa, as a replacement for injured captain Ryan Nelsen. Where New Zealand would go on to earn their first ever Senior Men's International point at a FIFA tournament after a 0–0 draw with Iraq.n.

Vicelich continued to make himself available for selection for the crucial 2010 FIFA World Cup qualifiers against Bahrain as New Zealand vied for the right to join football's most prestigious tournament for the second time in their history.

Vicelich has played 96 times for the All Whites including a record 88 official full internationals in which he scored 7 goals, his appearance in the first leg against Bahrain equalling Vaughan Coveny's then record of 64 official international caps. He went one better in the second leg in Wellington as he helped his country reach the 2010 FIFA World Cup.

On 10 May 2010, Vicelich was named in New Zealand's final 23-man squad to compete at the 2010 FIFA World Cup. He went on to play in New Zealand's three games there.

On 25 March 2011 Vicelich captained New Zealand in their 1–1 draw with China in Wuhan. He would retire from International Football in 2013 after the qualifying process for the 2014 FIFA World Cup was unsuccessful, his official last game was against Mexico at the Azteca Stadium.

Broadcasting Career 
From 2021, he became the analyst with fellow former New Zealand goalkeeper, Jacob Spoonley, for Sky Sports as New Zealand build up to 2022 World Cup Qualification.

Personal life
Vicelich is of Croatian descent. He is a former student at Liston College and Rutherford College, having graduated in 1994.

Honours

Club
With Waitakere City
Chatham Cup: 1994
New Zealand Football Championship: 1995

With Central United
Chatham Cup: 1997, 1998, 2012
New Zealand Football Championship: 1999

With Auckland City FC
OFC Champions League: 2009, 2011, 2012, 2013, 2014, 2015, 2016.
FIFA Club World Cup: 2014 (Bronze medal)
New Zealand Football Championship: 2008–09, 2013–14, 2014–15

International
OFC Nations Cup
Winners: 1998, 2002, 2008
Runners-up: 2000
Third Place: 2004, 2012

Individual
Member of the New Zealand Order of Merit for services to football, 2015 New Year Honours
Oceania Footballer of the Year: 2009
New Zealand Young Player of the Year: 1994
New Zealand International Player of the Year: 2002
Oceania All Stars XI 2008
Auckland Sportsman of the Year 2010
Auckland Overall Sporting Excellence Award 2010
Friends of Football Medal of Excellence 2014
FIFA Club World Cup Bronze Ball: 2014
 Ivan Vicelich has the record number of consecutive participations in the FIFA Club World Cup, taking part in 2011, 2012, 2013 and 2014
2014–15 OFC Champions League Golden Ball
Jack Batty Memorial Trophy (2): 1994, 1997
IFFHS OFC Men's Team of the Decade 2011–2020

Halberg Awards
Team of the Year 2010
Supreme Award 2010
NZs Favourite Sporting Moment 2010

Career statistics

Club

International goals and caps
New Zealand's goal tally first.

International career statistics

International goals

See also
 New Zealand national football team
 New Zealand at the FIFA World Cup
 New Zealand national football team results
 List of New Zealand international footballers

References

External links
 Ivan Vicelich Interview
 RSSSF Profile
 
 NZ Football Profile
 
 Ivan Vicelich Statistics

1976 births
Living people
New Zealand people of Croatian descent
New Zealand association footballers
New Zealand international footballers
Football Kingz F.C. players
Roda JC Kerkrade players
RKC Waalwijk players
Auckland City FC players
Eredivisie players
Central United F.C. players
Shenzhen F.C. players
Waitakere City FC players
Expatriate footballers in China
New Zealand expatriate sportspeople in China
Chinese Super League players
New Zealand Football Championship players
Expatriate footballers in the Netherlands
New Zealand expatriate sportspeople in the Netherlands
1998 OFC Nations Cup players
1999 FIFA Confederations Cup players
2000 OFC Nations Cup players
2002 OFC Nations Cup players
2003 FIFA Confederations Cup players
2004 OFC Nations Cup players
2008 OFC Nations Cup players
2009 FIFA Confederations Cup players
2010 FIFA World Cup players
2012 OFC Nations Cup players
Association footballers from Auckland
Association football defenders
People educated at Rutherford College, Auckland
People educated at Liston College
Members of the New Zealand Order of Merit